Radio is the ninth solo album by Steep Canyon Rangers, their eleventh overall. It was released on August 28, 2015. The album peaked at No. 1 on the Billboard Bluegrass Albums chart on 18 September 2015 and spent a total of 41 weeks on that chart. The title song was nominated for Song of the Year by the International Bluegrass Music Association in 2016.

Critical reception

Mark Deming of AllMusic begins his review with, "The Steep Canyon Rangers have spent much of their career walking a fine line between traditional bluegrass and acoustic music with a strong contemporary pop and country influence, and they've blurred the lines between the two sides of their musical personality more than ever before on 2015's Radio."

Hal Horowitz concludes his review for American Songwriter with, "The Rangers''' vocal harmonies feel lived in and natural, adding more down home goodness that springs from these players with an easygoing charm. Ditto for the music that finds the Rangers coalescing in ways only acquired through over a decade and a half of playing live. The Martin connection was icing on the cake for an outfit that, based on albums as strong as Radio, was primed and ready for their unsuspecting thrust into the spotlight."

In Donald Teplyske's review for Country Standard Time, he concluded with, "Steep Canyon Rangers continue to be one of the most lively acoustic bands working, recording well-written, thoughtful original songs that go to unexpected places; there are few bands like them. Unless "Radio" is a 'one-off,' however, it's not sure we can still call them bluegrass."

Track listing

Musicians
Graham Sharp – Banjo, Vocals, Harmonica
Charles R. Humphrey III – Bass
Mike Ashworth – Drums, Guitar, Vocals
Nicky Sanders – Fiddle, Vocals
Woody Platt – Guitar, Vocals
Mike Guggino – Mandolin, Vocals
Jerry Douglas – Guitar, Dobro, Resonator Guitar [National], Lap Steel Guitar
Shannon Whitworth –  Duet Vocals on "Down That Road Again"

Production
Package Design – Jimmy Hole
Assistant Engineer – Clay Miller
Mastered By – Paul Blakemore
Mixed By – Julian Dreyer
Photography By – Sandlin Gaither
Photography By (Live) – Shelly Swanger
Producer – Jerry Douglas
Recorded By – Julian Dreyer
Additional Recording By – Ryan Carr

Track information and credits verified from the album's liner notes. Some information was adapted from Discogs and AllMusic''.

References

External links
Steep Canyon Rangers Official Site
Rounder Records Official Site

2015 albums
Rounder Records albums
Steep Canyon Rangers albums